Jacobje Jantje "Cobie" Buter (also Coby; born 17 May 1946) is a retired Dutch swimmer who won the bronze medal in 100 m backstroke at the 1970 European Aquatics Championships. She also competed at the 1968 Summer Olympics and finished seventh in the 4 × 100 m medley relay. She helped the Dutch team to set a new European record in the same event in 1968. Between 1965 and 1970 she won four national titles and set four records in the 100 m backstroke.

References

1946 births
Living people
European Aquatics Championships medalists in swimming
Dutch female backstroke swimmers
Olympic swimmers of the Netherlands
People from Steenwijkerland
Swimmers at the 1968 Summer Olympics
Sportspeople from Overijssel
20th-century Dutch women